Erik Simon (born 21 August 1987 in Karl-Marx-Stadt) is a German ski jumper. He came in on 30th place in Kuopio 2009 as his best result in the World Cup so far.

References

External links
 Personal Web site

1987 births
German male ski jumpers
Living people
Sportspeople from Chemnitz